Agnes Hamvas (born 3 September 1946) is a Hungarian archer who represented Hungary in archery at the 1972 Summer Olympic Games.

Career 

She finished 22nd in the women's individual event with a score of 2265 points.

References

External links 
 Profile on worldarchery.org

1946 births
Living people
Hungarian female archers
Olympic archers of Hungary
Archers at the 1972 Summer Olympics